Emerald Germs of Ireland (2001) is a black comedy novel by Irish writer Patrick McCabe. Each chapter is begun with an Irish folk song.

Plot summary
The book focuses on the life of Gullytown homeboy Pat McNab, the village idiot. The alternately adoring and criticizing attention by his mother, Maimie and the total abusiveness of his father finally send him over the edge.

He responds by ridding Ireland of "germs," however, in this case, the "germs" are people.  He kills both his father and mother, his neighbors and local visitors to the village.  His list includes four-legged "germs" as he kills several donkeys.

He then digs his mother up from her grave after the removal of each succeeding "germ".

The title "Emerald Germs of Ireland" is similar to Patrick McCabe's The Butcher Boy which often brings up a music book titled "Emerald Gems of Ireland".

References 

2001 Irish novels
Novels by Patrick McCabe (novelist)
Picador (imprint) books
Novels set in Ireland